Janež is a surname. Notable people with the surname include:

Janez Janež (1913–1990), Slovenian medical doctor and surgeon, who worked for most of his life in Taiwan
Andrej Janež, Slovenian diabetologist and diabetes researcher

Slovene-language surnames